Withersworldwide (Withers Bergman) is an international law firm with offices in the United States, United Kingdom, Europe, Asia, and the Caribbean. Withers specializes in tax, trust and estate planning, as well as litigation, employment, family law, and other legal issues facing high-net-worth individuals.

History
Withers was founded in London, England in 1896. In 2002, Withers merged with the New Haven, Connecticut-based law firm Bergman, Horowitz & Reynolds to form Withers Bergman LLP in the United States and Withers LLP in the United Kingdom and the rest of the world.

Offices
Withers has offices in the British Virgin Islands, Cambridge, Geneva, Greenwich, Hong Kong, London, Los Angeles, Milan, New Haven, New York City, Padua, Rancho Santa Fe, San Diego, San Francisco, Singapore, Sydney, Tokyo, Boston and Zürich.

Rankings
Withers has been recognized as one of the best law firms in the United States and the United Kingdom by U.S. News & World Report and Legal 500.  In addition, Withers ranked as one of The Sunday Times's 2012 Best Companies to Work For.

Cox controversy
The former Attorney General for England and Wales, Geoffrey Cox was contracted by Withers following his sacking in September 2020. By 20 November 2021 Withers were reported to have paid Cox more than £800,000 in fees in a period in which he retained his parliamentary seat of Torridge and West Devon. A video appearing to show Cox using his parliamentary office for a Zoom meeting was published by Sky News which also featured Lauren Peaty, a Senior Associate with Withers. Cox explained he could not remain part of the Zoom meeting, which also included Andrew Fahie, Premier of the British Virgin Isles.

References

Law firms of the United Kingdom
Law firms established in 1896
Foreign law firms with offices in the United States
1896 establishments in the United Kingdom
Foreign law firms with offices in Hong Kong